George may refer to:

People
 George (given name)
 George (surname)
 George (singer), American-Canadian singer George Nozuka, known by the mononym George
 George V, King of Great Britain, Ireland, the British Dominions and Emperor of India from 1910-1936
 George VI, King of Great Britain, Ireland, the British Dominions and Emperor of India from 1936-1952
 Prince George of Wales
 George Papagheorghe, also known as Jorge / GEØRGE
 George, stage name of Giorgio Moroder
 George Harrison, an English musician and singer-songwriter
 George, son of Andrew I of Hungary

Places

South Africa
 George, Western Cape
 George Airport

United States
 George, Iowa
 George, Missouri
 George, Washington
 George County, Mississippi
 George Air Force Base, a former U.S. Air Force base located in California

Characters
 George (Peppa Pig), a 2-year-old pig and Peppa's younger brother in the British show Peppa Pig
 George Beard, a character in Captain Underpants
 George Jetson, one of the main characters from the animated television series The Jetsons
 George Kirrin, a Famous Five character known simply as George
 George Liquor, a character created by John Kricfalusi
 George Lundgren, a character in the Arthur book and television series
 George McFly, a character of the Back to the Future film trilogy
 George Owens, a character played by Bob Uecker from Mr. Belvedere
 George Papadopolis and George "Papa" Papadopolis, characters in the American sitcom television series Webster
 George the Steamroller, a character from Thomas the Tank Engine and Friends
 the title character of the Curious George franchise
 the title character of  the animated television program George of the Jungle
 the title character of the American animated television series George Shrinks
 the title character of the TV series George Lopez

Computing
 George (algebraic compiler) also known as 'Laning and Zierler system', an algebraic compiler by Laning and Zierler in 1952
 GEORGE (computer), early computer built by Argonne National Laboratory in 1957
 GEORGE (operating system), a range of operating systems (George 1-4) for the ICT 1900 range of computers in the 1960s
 GEORGE (programming language), an autocode system invented by Charles Leonard Hamblin in 1957
 George (robot), a simple humanoid robot built by Tony Sale in 1949

Film and television
 George (1972 TV series), a Canadian-Swiss television series
 George (1993 TV series), a short-lived sitcom starring George Foreman
 George, the sixth MGM lion
 "George" (M*A*S*H), a 1974 episode of the television series M*A*S*H

Print
 George (magazine), a magazine founded by John F. Kennedy, Jr
 George (novel), a 2016 novel by Alex Gino
 (George), a 1970 novel by E. L. Konigsburg

Music
 George (band), an Australian band
 George (EP), an EP by Cartman
 "George" (song), a song by Headless Chickens
 "George", a 1959 spoken word track by Joyce Grenfell

Transport
 Autopilot, affectionately known as "George"
 George (bus service), a bus service in Falls Church, Virginia, United States
 George (ship), an Australian sloop wrecked in 1806
 Kawanishi N1K-J, a Japanese fighter aircraft Allied codenamed "George"
 Pullman porters, often referred to as "George"

Animals
 George (dog), a Jack Russell Terrier who defended children from a two-dog attack
 George (lobster)
 George (snail)
 Lonesome George, the last Pinta Island tortoise

Other uses
 George (club), a members club on Mount Street in London's Mayfair district
 George (clothing), a clothing brand sold exclusively in Walmart and Asda stores
 George (vacuum cleaner)
 Greenhouse George, a nuclear bomb

See also
 Georg (disambiguation)
 George Bridge (disambiguation)
 George Street (disambiguation)
 Lake George (disambiguation)
 List of hurricanes named Georges
 Tropical Storm George (disambiguation)
 Georgi (disambiguation)
 Georgia (disambiguation)
 Georgie (disambiguation)
 Georgii (disambiguation)
 Georgina (disambiguation)
 Georgy (disambiguation)
 Gorge (disambiguation)
 The George (disambiguation)

sv:Georg#Personer med namnet Georg eller George